Princess Catgirl (stylized in all caps) is the second studio album by Norwegian electronic musician Cashmere Cat. It was released on 20 September 2019 through Interscope, succeeding his commercially successful debut album 9.

Background
Cashmere Cat expressed that the album relies less on credited guest vocalists and more on himself as a musician. In interviews, he has cited Princess Catgirl as a persona and the public face of his music. "She's very cute and powerful. I've always been shy—since the beginning of being an artist I would hide my face, not want to do interviews, hide behind other artists. I guess you could say I was scared. So I created Princess Catgirl to be the face of my music. She makes me feel safe."

Track listing

Notes
  signifies an additional producer.
 All track titles are stylized in all caps.
 "Watergirl" samples the song "What a Girl Wants" originally performed by Christina Aguilera.
 "Moo" samples the song "Moonlight" originally performed by XXXTentacion.
 "Without You" samples the song "Love Myself" originally performed by Hailee Steinfeld.

Charts

References

2019 albums
Cashmere Cat albums
Albums produced by Cashmere Cat
Albums produced by Benny Blanco
Interscope Records albums
Albums produced by Sophie (musician)